Golidagh Rural District is a rural district (dehestan) in Golidagh District, Maraveh Tappeh County, Golestan Province, Iran. At the 2006 census, its population was 16,506, in 3,188 families.  The rural district has 29 villages.

References 

Rural Districts of Golestan Province
Maraveh Tappeh County